John Fox or Foxe may refer to:

Athletes
John Fox (baseball) (1859–1893), American Major League Baseball pitcher
John Fox (American football) (born 1955), American football coach
Tiger Jack Fox (1907–1954), American light-heavyweight boxer
John Fox (cricketer, born 1851) (1851–1929), English cricketer
John Fox (cricketer, born 1904) (1904–1961), English cricketer
John Fox (cricketer, born 1929) (1929–2016), English cricketer
John Fox (South African cricketer) (1929–2017), South African cricketer
John Fox (water polo) (born 1963), Australian water polo player
John Fox (hurler) (born 1892), Irish hurler
John Fox (footballer) (born 1940), Australian rules footballer
John Fox (rugby union) (1921–1999), Scottish rugby union player

Entertainers
John Fox (comedian) (1953–2012), American comedian
John Fox (composer, arranger, conductor), music conductor and composer
John James Fox (born 1980), English director of music videos
Johnny Fox (performer) (1953–2017), professional sword swallower and sleight-of-hand expert

Politicians
John Foxe (MP) (died 1586), Member of Parliament for Aldeburgh
John Fox (Newfoundland politician) (1818–1871), merchant and politician in Newfoundland
John Fox (congressman) (1835–1914), U.S. Representative from New York
Marcus Fox (1927–2002), British Conservative Party politician
John M. Fox, mayor of Grand Rapids, Michigan, 1856
Johnny Fox (1948–1995), Irish politician

Soldiers
Tinker Fox (1610–1650), English Parliamentarian soldier
John R. Fox (1915–1944), U.S. Army officer and Medal of Honor recipient in World War II

Writers
John Fox (biographer) (1693–1763), English biographer
John Fox (writer) (c. 1952–1990), American novelist and short-story writer
John Fox, Jr. (1862–1919), American journalist and novelist

Others
John Foxe (1516–1587), English clergyman
John Fox (1611–1691), Clerk of the Acatry to King Charles II
John A. Fox (1836–1920), American architect
John Charles Fox (1855–1943), English solicitor and Master of the Supreme Court, Chancery Division
John Fox (railway engineer) (1924–2001), Canadian civil engineer
John Fox (statistician) (born 1946), British statistician
John Foxe (neuroscientist) (born 1967), Irish neuroscientist
One of many DC Comics superheroes named the Flash

See also
John Foxx (born 1948), English pop musician born Dennis Leigh
Jon D. Fox (born 1947), Republican politician from Pennsylvania
Jonathan Fox (disambiguation)